One Way Ticket to Hell... and Back  is the second studio album by the British rock band The Darkness. It was released on 28 November 2005 through Atlantic Records, reaching number 11 on the UK Album Chart and eventually attaining platinum status in the UK. Three singles were released from the album. The lead single, "One Way Ticket", reached number 8 on the UK Singles Chart, as did the second single "Is It Just Me?"

Background

The album was produced by Roy Thomas Baker, best known for his work with Queen, a major influence on The Darkness. Bassist Frankie Poullain left the band during the early stages of production on the album, with most bass parts on the album played by Dan Hawkins. Poullain has said that "Hazel Eyes" is his favourite track on the record, citing, "I defy anyone after a couple of beverages to listen to "Hazel Eyes" standing up and NOT get the Michael Flatleys." Poullain was already familiar with six of the ten songs on the album, playing "Hazel Eyes", "Dinner Lady Arms", "Seemed Like a Good Idea at the Time" and "English Country Garden" on tour with the band before his departure. He also co-wrote four of the tracks featured on the album. The working title for the album was The Painstaking.

Track listing

Other tracks
 "Wanker" (B-side to One Way Ticket) (J. Hawkins/D. Hawkins) – 3:07
 "Grief Hammer" (B-side to One Way Ticket) (J. Hawkins/D. Hawkins) – 3:12
 "Shake (Like a Lettuce Leaf)" (B-side to Is It Just Me?) (J. Hawkins/D. Hawkins) – 3:18
 "Shit Ghost" (B-side to Is It Just Me?) (J. Hawkins/D. Hawkins) – 3:10

Reception
Reviews for the album were mixed. Q magazine proclaimed it the 22nd best album of 2005. However Planet Sound remarked how it was the "world's most expensive penis joke", regarding the costly delay of the album, and hyper-masculine themes throughout. In an interview with The Sun, Dan said that it cost £1 million to make.

Personnel
Justin Hawkins – Lead/backing vocals; lead/rhythm guitars; piano; Hammond organ; Mini-moog; synths; sitar
Dan Hawkins – Rhythm/lead guitars; bass guitars; tubular bells; marching drums; tambourine; triangle; backing vocals
Ed Graham – Drums
Richie Edwards – Bass guitars; backing vocals (touring member)

Additional musicians
Freddy Gomez – pan flute on "One Way Ticket"
Stuart Cassells – bagpipes on "Hazel Eyes"

Charts

Certifications

References

External links
 Article by Paul Tingen on the making of One Way Ticket To Hell... and Back in Sound on Sound
 

The Darkness (band) albums
2005 albums
Atlantic Records albums
Albums produced by Roy Thomas Baker